Mark Dragunski (born 22 December 1970) is a former German team handball player and currently a coach. He received a silver medal at the 2004 Summer Olympics in Athens with the German national team. He is European champion from 2004.

References

External links

1970 births
Living people
German male handball players
Olympic handball players of Germany
Handball players at the 2004 Summer Olympics
Olympic silver medalists for Germany
Olympic medalists in handball
Medalists at the 2004 Summer Olympics